The United Nations Educational, Scientific and Cultural Organization (UNESCO) designates World Heritage Sites of outstanding universal value to cultural or natural heritage which  have been nominated by countries which are signatories to the UNESCO World Heritage Convention, established in 1972. Cultural heritage consists of monuments (such as architectural works, monumental sculptures, or inscriptions), groups of buildings, and sites (including archaeological sites). Natural features (consisting of physical and biological formations), geological and physiographical formations (including habitats of threatened species of animals and plants), and natural sites which are important from the point of view of science, conservation or natural beauty, are defined as natural heritage. Greece ratified the convention on 17 July 1981, making its natural and cultural sites eligible for inclusion on the list.

, there are 18 properties in Greece inscribed on the World Heritage List, 16 of which are cultural sites and two (Meteora and Mount Athos) are mixed, listed for both their natural and cultural significance. The first site added to the list was the Temple of Apollo Epicurius at Bassae, in 1986. The next two sites listed were the Archeological site of Delphi and the Acropolis of Athens, in the following year. Five sites were added in 1988, two in 1989 and 1990 each, one in 1992, one in 1996, two in 1999, and one in 2007. The most recent site added was the Archaeological Site of Philippi, in 2016. There are no transnational sites in Greece. In addition, there are 14 sites on the tentative list, all of which were nominated in 2014.



World Heritage Sites 
UNESCO lists sites under ten criteria; each entry must meet at least one of the criteria. Criteria i through vi are cultural, and vii through x are natural.

Tentative list 
In addition to the sites inscribed on the World Heritage list, member states can maintain a list of tentative sites that they may consider for nomination. Nominations for the World Heritage list are only accepted if the site has previously been listed on the tentative list. , Greece had 14 such sites on its tentative list.

See also
Tourism in Greece

References

Greece
 
Greece geography-related lists
World Heritage Sites